Bellview Winery is a winery in the Landisville section of Buena in Atlantic County, New Jersey. A family produce farm since 1914, the vineyard was first planted in 2000, and opened to the public in 2001. Bellview has 40 acres of grapes under cultivation, and produces 8,000 cases of wine per year. The farm was named by the great-grandfather of the current owner, and is of Italian origin.

Wines
Bellview Winery is in the Outer Coastal Plain AVA, and produces wine from Blaufränkisch (Lemberger), Cabernet Franc, Cabernet Sauvignon, Cayuga White, Chambourcin, Chardonnay, Fredonia, Ives noir, Merlot, Muscat Ottonel, Niagara, Petit Verdot, Pinot gris, Syrah, Tinta Cão, Touriga Nacional, Traminette, Vidal Blanc, and Viognier grapes. Bellview also makes fruit wines from apples, blueberries, cranberries, and dandelions. It is one of only a handful of wineries in the United States that produces wine from dandelions (Taraxacum officinale). Bellview is also the only New Jersey winery that uses Tinta Cão and Touriga Nacional, which are red vinifera grapes indigenous to Portugal that are often used to make port. The winery was a participant at the Judgment of Princeton, a wine tasting organized by the American Association of Wine Economists that compared New Jersey wines to premium French vintages.

Associations/Licensing
Bellview Winery is a member of the Garden State Wine Growers Association, the Outer Coastal Plain Vineyard Association, as well as two wine trails in their local region, including the Two Bridges Wine Trail and Pinelands Reserve Wine Trail. As a founding member of the Outer Coastal Plain Vineyard Association, Bellview Winery helped to form the creation of the Outer Coastal Plain AVA region, opening up opportunity for wineries in New Jersey to grow as their own unique destination.

Bellview operates under a Plenary Winery License from the New Jersey Division of Alcoholic Beverage Control, allowing it to produce an unrestricted amount of wine, as well as operate up to 15 off-premises sales rooms. As a result of further legislation in 2012, Bellview Winery also has the option to mail wine directly to some consumers, under new Direct Shipping laws in the state. Combined with Direct Shipping laws, Bellview's license allows the shipment of up to 12 cases per year to consumers In or Out-Of-State.

See also
Alcohol laws of New Jersey
American wine
Judgment of Princeton
List of wineries, breweries, and distilleries in New Jersey
New Jersey Farm Winery Act
New Jersey Wine Industry Advisory Council
New Jersey wine

References

External links

Garden State Wine Growers Association
Outer Coastal Plain Vineyard Association

Wineries in New Jersey
Tourist attractions in Atlantic County, New Jersey
2001 establishments in New Jersey
Buena, New Jersey